Gaston Eduardo Molina (23 July 1980 – 26 February 2010) was an Argentine football striker who last played for V-League club Bình Dương F.C. He was found dead in a hotel in Ho Chi Minh City on 26 February 2010. The cause was initially believed to be drug overdose.

Molina was a hard working player both in Argentina and Vietnam and was admired by the fans. In Vietnam, he was a key player of SHB Da Nang as the club won the 2009 title. Molina joined Bình Dương in September 2009 and was a key player, helping his team reach the semi-final of the 2009 AFC Cup.

References

2010 deaths
1980 births
Argentine footballers
Expatriate footballers in Vietnam
Association football forwards
Argentine expatriate footballers
Ferro Carril Oeste footballers
SHB Da Nang FC players
Becamex Binh Duong FC players
V.League 1 players
Argentine expatriate sportspeople in Vietnam
Drug-related deaths
Footballers from Córdoba, Argentina